Senator Phillips may refer to:

Albert L. Phillips (1824–?), Wisconsin State Senate
Charles H. Phillips (1859–1938), Wisconsin State Senate
Charles Phillips (Wisconsin politician, born 1824) (1824–1879), Wisconsin State Senate
Christopher H. Phillips (1920–2008), Massachusetts State Senate
Elaine Phillips (fl. 2010s), New York State Senate
James T. Phillips (1953–2014), New Jersey State Senate
Jim Phillips Sr. (1931–2018), North Carolina State Senate
Jimmy Phillips (politician) (1913–2002), Texas State Senate
John R. Phillips (American politician) (1887–1983), California
John Phillips (mayor) (1770–1823), Massachusetts State Senate
John Phillips (Wisconsin politician) (1823–1903), Wisconsin State Senate
Orie Leon Phillips (1885–1974), New Mexico State Senate
Randy Phillips (politician) (born 1950), Alaska State Senate
Samuel Phillips Jr. (1752–1802), Massachusetts State Senate
Stephen C. Phillips (1801–1857), Massachusetts State Senate
William Phillips Sr. (1722–1804), Massachusetts State Senate

See also
Kristin Phillips-Hill (fl. 2010s), Pennsylvania State Senate
Senator Philip (disambiguation)